Chak De Bachche was an Indian television reality series that aired on 9X channel. The series is a little kids' dance show, where the kids dance with their partners to compete with the opposing teams. The series is produced by 9X and Saibaba Telefilms. The teams are divided into two separate teams: Metro Rockers ("Bade sehar ki bachche" - kids from big cities) & Desi Dhurandhars ("Chote sehar ke bachche" - kids from small cities)

Jury
Salim–Sulaiman
Raveena Tandon
Ganesh Acharya
format n scripts
Rajeev Arora
Dr. Abhishek Dwivedi
Thought Vendors

Rules
There are a total of three disciplines, with each one judged by a different judge. The first discipline is composed of 'Music & Singing': Salim–Sulaiman; second discipline is composed of overall performance: Raveena Tandon; and the last discipline is composed of 'Choreography & Dancing': Ganesh Acharya.

Besides, each of the teams are assisted by a different captain: Team Rockers by Roshni Chopra and Desi Dhurandars by Manoj Tiwari.

Contestants
Following is a list of contestants of 'Chak De Bachche':

External links
Chak De Bachche Official Site on 9X
Fan Site

9X (TV channel) original programming
Indian reality television series
2008 Indian television series debuts
2008 Indian television series endings